Digital Media City Station (디지털미디어시티역) is a railway station on Seoul Subway Line 6, AREX and the Gyeongui-Jungang Line. The former names of this station were Multimedia City Station (멀티미디어시티역) for the AREX station and Susaek (수색) for the Line 6.

Gallery

References

External links
 Station information from Korail

Railway stations opened in 2000
Seoul Metropolitan Subway stations
Metro stations in Eunpyeong District
Metro stations in Mapo District